Carlos Amigo Vallejo, O.F.M. (23 August 1934 – 27 April 2022) was a Spanish prelate of the Catholic Church who served as Archbishop of Seville from 1982 to 2009. He was made a cardinal in 2003. He was archbishop of Tangier in Morocco from 1973 to 1982.

Biography
Born in Medina de Rioseco, Valladolid Province, Amigo Vallejo studied medicine in Valladolid before joining the Franciscan order, later studying philosophy in Rome and psychology in Madrid. He was ordained a priest in 1960.

He became Archbishop of Tanger in Morocco in 1973 and then became Archbishop of Seville on 22 May 1982. Instead of going to Rome to receive his pallium from Pope John Paul II, he received the pallium from Antonio Innocenti, Apostolic Nuncio to Spain, on 29 June 1982 during his installation mass at the metropolitan cathedral of Seville. 

He was decorated with the Orden al Mérito de los Padres de la Patria Dominicana, the highest decoration granted by the Dominican Republic in February 1995. 

Pope John Paul made him Cardinal-Priest of Santa Maria in Monserrato degli Spagnoli in the consistory of 21 October 2003.

He participated in the Papal conclave in 2005, which elected Cardinal Joseph Ratzinger as Pope Benedict XVI.

On 5 November 2009, Pope Benedict XVI accepted his resignation as Archbishop of Seville.

On 22 September 2012, Amigo Vallejo was appointed by Pope Benedict XVI to serve as his Special Envoy to the closing celebrations of the fifth centenary of the arrival of Puerto Rico's first Bishop, Don Alonso Manso, set to take place in San Juan, Puerto Rico, on 19 November 2012.

He participated as a cardinal elector in the papal conclave in 2013 which elected Cardinal Jorge Bergoglio as Pope Francis.

Amigo Vallejo died on 27 April 2022 from heart failure following lung surgery.

References

External links

 
 Biography at catholic-pages.com
 Carlos Amigo Vallejo at Catholic Hierarchy

1934 births
2022 deaths
People from the Province of Valladolid
20th-century Roman Catholic archbishops in Spain
21st-century Roman Catholic archbishops in Spain
21st-century Spanish cardinals
Roman Catholic archbishops of Seville
Spanish Friars Minor
Bishops appointed by Pope Paul VI
Cardinals created by Pope John Paul II
Members of the Order of the Holy Sepulchre
Franciscan cardinals
Roman Catholic archbishops of Tanger
Deaths from pulmonary edema